Bee Run is a stream in northern St. Francois County  in the U.S. state of Missouri. It is a tributary of the Big River.

Bee Run was so named on account of honeybees near its course.

See also
List of rivers of Missouri

References

Rivers of St. Francois County, Missouri
Rivers of Missouri